Retail in Southern California dates back to its first dry goods store that Jonathan Temple opened in 1827 on Calle Principal (Main Street), when Los Angeles was still a Mexican village. After the American conquest, as the pueblo grew into a small town surpassing 4,000 population in 1860, dry goods stores continued to open, including the forerunners of what would be local chains. Larger retailers moved progressively further south to the 1880s-1890s Central Business District, which was later razed to become the Civic Center. Starting in the mid-1890s, major stores moved ever southward, first onto Broadway around 3rd, then starting in 1905 to Broadway between 4th and 9th, then starting in 1915 westward onto West Seventh Street up to Figueroa. For half a century Broadway and Seventh streets together formed one of America's largest and busiest downtown shopping districts.

Branches in what were then the suburbs like Hollywood and Mid-Wilshire were built in the 1920s, and local department stores as well as branches of national variety stores and J. C. Penney opened in local downtowns in the outlying towns that would become the suburbs. However, real suburbanization took off in the 1950s with the building of shopping centers across the suburbs. By the 1960s few suburbanites ventured to Downtown Los Angeles to shop, and regional and community shopping centers flourished. Local chains Bullock's, The Broadway, J. W. Robinson's, May Co. and Buffums built out dozens of branches each in malls across Southern California, as did Sears and J. C. Penney.

In the 1990s the local department store chains either closed or were folded into Macy's. Alternative shopping center formats like power centers, lifestyle centers, and outlet malls arose, strip malls flourished, and as elsewhere in the country, shopping malls began to close or were transformed into strip-style community shopping centers. Retail in Southern California today is much like anywhere else in the United States, with a variety of shopping center formats, and ever-increasing competition from online shopping and major fallout of closed stores as a results of the 2020 COVID-19 pandemic which closed stores for months.

Origins near the Plaza (1827-1870s)
The first dry goods store was opened by Jonathan Temple in 1827 when Los Angeles was a Mexican pueblo. Some of the dry goods retailers who opened over the following decades included two Harris & Frank (1856) and Desmond's (department store) (1862), that would grow into local chains that survived until the end of the 20th century. The dry goods stores migrated in the 1860s and 1870s a few blocks south of the Plaza to Temple, First, and Main streets, and some would grow into the first department stores, such as the City of Paris, Jacoby Bros., Hamburger's, and Coulter's.

Downey blocks

On the northwest corner of Temple and Main streets stood four buildings in succession, the first two of which had a key role in the history of retail in Southern California, as it was home to a number of upscale retailers who would later grow to be big names in the city, and some, regional chains. The site later became a Post Office and Federal Building, and is now the Spring Street U.S. Courthouse.
Old Downey Block (?-1871), northwest corner of Temple and Main, Replaced by the Downey Block (1871-1910). Retailers that got their start here included Harris & Jacoby, forerunners to the Harris & Frank clothing chain and the large Jacoby Bros. department store; and M. Kremer, forerunner of the Los Angeles City of Paris.
Downey Block (1871–1910), replaced by the New Post Office in 1910. Retailers who were located here included Coulter's (1878-9), Jacoby Bros. (1878-9), and Quincy Hall (1876–1882), forerunner of Harris & Frank.

Temple Block
Temple Block was actually a collection of different structures that occupied the block bounded by Spring, Main and Temple, erected in 1858 and expanded in 1871. The block had many law offices and also a key role in the retail history of Los Angeles, as it was the first home to several upscale retailers who would become big names in the city: Desmond's (1870–1882) and Jacoby Bros. (1879–1891).

By the 1880s, most upscale retailers would have migrated southwestward, clustering around First and Spring in what had become the new center of the 1880s-1890s central business district, which was demolished in the 1920s–1950s and it today the site of the (mostly) government buildings of the Civic Center.

Broadway as regional shopping mecca
The major department stores started to migrate to, or were built along, Broadway between 3rd and 9th streets around 1905–1915, and built very large stores that would over the following decades expand to cover entire or nearly entire city blocks. The Broadway led the way in 1896, Hamburger's (later May Company California in 1906, and Bullock's in 1907. Starting with J. W. Robinson's in 1915, the more upscale stores also migrated westward along Seventh Street as far as Figueroa, where Barker Bros. built a million-square-foot store in 1926. Both streets together formed a very large downtown shopping district.

Table of department stores on Broadway and 7th streets

The first outlying and suburban shopping districts
In the first half of the 20th century, some outlying towns also saw their downtowns grow into large regional shopping districts, and some of the local department stores based there would become small regional chains after World War II, like Buffums and Roberts (Long Beach), Boston Stores (Inglewood), Harris Co. (San Bernardino), Walker Scott and Marston's (San Diego), and Nash's (Pasadena).

Hollywood
Hollywood established itself as the only major suburban shopping district of the pre-World War II era, attracting branches of local and national stores, both mainstream and upscale, between the late 1910s and the late 1920s. In the 1920s Hollywood Boulevard and adjacent streets became a major regional shopping district, both for everyday needs and appliances, but increasingly also for high-end clothing and accessories, in part because of the nearby film studios. Chains that opened includes Schwab's in 1921, Mullen & Bluett in 1922, I. Magnin in 1923, Myer Siegel in 1925, F. W. Grand and Newberry's (dime stores) in 1926–8, and Roos Brothers in 1929. In 1922, stock was sold to finance construction of a much larger department store at Hollywood and Vine, originally to have been a Boadway Bros. When Boadway's went out of business the next year, B. H. Dyas, a Downtown Los Angeles-based department store, opened in the  building in March 1928, then sold their lease to The Broadway in 1931 – the building still a landmark today, known as the Broadway Hollywood Building. By 1930 the shopping district consisted of over 300 stores. The area would later face competition from areas along Wilshire Boulevard: the easternmost around Bullocks Wilshire which opened in 1929, second the Miracle Mile, and finally, the shopping district of Beverly Hills, where Saks Fifth Avenue opened a store in 1938.

Branches of downtown department stores
Bullock's and B. H. Dyas department stores built the first suburban branches in 1929, in Mid-Wilshire and Hollywood respectively, Bullock's and Desmond's opened boutique stores in Westwood Village and Palm Springs, Sears built several stores in the suburbs (1927-1939), and Saks Fifth Avenue opened in Beverly Hills, which would then soon replace Hollywood as the city's largest upscale suburban shopping district. But Downtown Los Angeles was still a goliath of retail square footage compared to anything else in Southern California.

1950s-1980s: Suburban shopping centers and malls
True suburbanization took off after World War II with the opening of very large shopping centers like Crenshaw Center (1947), Lakewood Center (1952), Valley Plaza (1951) – in the mid-1950s claiming to be the largest shopping center on the West Coast of the United States and the third-largest in the country, and Panorama City Shopping Center (1955). Bullock's built a series of four "Fashion Squares", starting with Santa Ana Fashion Square in 1958, and Broadway and Robinson's also backed new suburban centers. By the 1960s, most Los Angeles area shoppers didn't bother (or had no particular need) to go to Downtown Los Angeles to shop, far from most suburbs and with more difficult parking facilities than in the suburbs. Broadway instead continued as a great shopping hub, but from the 1970s through the mid-2000s, for immigrant Latin Americans and local Hispanic shoppers with its bazaar (or indoor swap meet-type) offerings and quinceañera and wedding dress shops. More and more regional malls were built, as well as some community shopping centers with single department stores, for example Honer Plaza in Santa Ana, Orangefair Mall in Fullerton, and three centers in three centers in Santa Fe Springs alone. The downtown areas of the older suburbs like Long Beach, Santa Ana, Anaheim, and Whittier, lost their function as regional shopping districts, except for those building downtown enclosed malls like Plaza Pasadena, Santa Monica Place and San Bernardino's Central City Mall, and Beverly Hills, which retained its status as the premiere luxury shopping district. Pedestrian malls in outlying downtowns were largely unsuccessful such as the Golden Mall in Burbank, Pomona Mall, and Riverside Main Street Mall and, until its renovation, Santa Monica's Third Street Mall.

Discount department stores and membership stores, mostly Los Angeles-based, like The Akron, Fedco, Fedmart, Gemco, Mervyn's, Pic 'N' Save, Unimart, White Front, and Zody's, thrived in this era as well.

The end of the Los Angeles chains
Timeline of transformation to Macy's

In the 1990s, via a series of takeovers, the "big four" Los Angeles-based department stores: Bullock's, The Broadway, Robinson's and May Company, plus Bullocks Wilshire and I. Magnin, became part of Macy's, which in turn became part of Federated Department Stores (since renamed Macy's Inc.), and were turned into Macy's, Bloomingdales, or were sold or closed.

In 1988, Robert Campeau took over Federated and sold Bullock's and I. Magnin to Macy's. In 1990 Bullock's Wilshire (BW) became part of I. Magnin and some BW branches were closed. However, Macy's went bankrupt in 1992, and Federated bought Macy's in 1994, and in 1995, Federated's Macy's closed the entire I. Magnin chain.

In 1995 Federated bought Broadway Stores, Inc. and thus, The Broadway chain. Macy's changed the nameplate of Broadway and Bullock's stores to Macy's, except some locations which it converted to Bloomingdales.

Owner May Department Stores combined its midrange May Company and upscale Robinson's chains into a single 45-store midrange chain, Robinsons-May, in 1993. In 2005, Federated took over May and Robinsons-May was dissolved, and as with Bullock's and Broadway nine years prior in 1996, some stores became branches of Macy's, while others were closed, sold, or transformed into Bloomingdales.

National discount big box retailers like Walmart and Target became more popular during this people and some malls, like Panorama City Shopping Center, became anchored only by discount stores. The local discount store chains closed.

Today
New models of shopping centers thrived. Large power centers with multiple big box retailers, and older malls were demolished to make way for community centers. The strip mall thrived. A renewed Downtown Burbank as well as Third Street Promenade in Santa Monica were successes, as are the outdoor, pedestrian-oriented spaces of The Grove at Farmer's Market and Westfield Century City. Lifestyle centers like Irvine Spectrum Center and outlet malls like The Citadel were built. Many of the largest traditional enclosed shopping malls still thrive, such as South Coast Plaza, Los Cerritos Center, and Westfield Santa Anita, to name a few. The formerly busy retail districts of suburban downtowns such as Santa Ana, City of Orange, Burbank, North Hollywood, Riverside, and Pasadena are now often entertainment and arts districts with outdoor dining and eclectic, artsy retail mix.

Today, no department store chains are based in Southern California except National Stores/Fallas Paredes, and Curacao, both discount retailers targeting the Hispanic market.

References

History of retail in the United States